Turbo exquisitus, common name the exquisite turban, is a species of sea snail, marine gastropod mollusk in the family Turbinidae.

Description
The length of the shell varies between 12 mm and 24 mm. The shell is small, imperforate, and solid. Its color pattern is pale greenish buff or light pink, painted with very broad descending flames of an orange color on the upper portion of the whorls. The  whorls are angulated on the periphery, and flattened above.  The upper whorls are encircled below the angle with two ribs and the body whorl with five stout scabrously nodulous ribs. Between these and the sutures are four or five smaller and closer ribs of a similar character, and on the base of the body whorl about eight ribs which are less nodulous and scabrous than those above, the interstices being crossed by fine striae. The spire is somewhat elevated. The aperture is nearly circular and pearly within. The columella is thickened, terminating in a blunt callosity at the base.

A variety occurs of a brilliant orange-red color throughout.

Distribution
This marine species occurs off Southern Queensland and New South Wales, Australia.

References

 Angas, G.F. 1877. Description of one genus and twenty-five species of marine shells from New South Wales. Proceedings of the Zoological Society of London 1877: 171–177, pl. 26, figs 26, 27
 Iredale, T. & McMichael, D.F., 1962. A reference list of the marine Mollusca of New South Wales. Mem. Aust. Mus., 11:0-0
 Wilson, B., 1993. Australian Marine Shells. Prosobranch Gastropods. Odyssey Publishing, Kallaroo, WA
 Williams, S.T. (2007). Origins and diversification of Indo-West Pacific marine fauna: evolutionary history and biogeography of turban shells (Gastropoda, Turbinidae). Biological Journal of the Linnean Society, 2007, 92, 573–592

External links
 

exquisitus
Gastropods of Australia
Gastropods described in 1877